Cara Black and Lisa Raymond were the defending champions, but did not compete this year.

Eleni Daniilidou and Nicole Pratt won the title, defeating Iveta Benešová and Claudine Schaul 6–2, 6–4 in the final.

Seeds

Draw

Draw

External links
 Main and Qualifying draws

2004 WTA Tour